Nakhon Chai Si Road is a road in Bangkok. Its name is origin of Thanon Nakhon Chai Si subdistrict of Dusit district, since it runs through the area.

It starts from Rama VI road, passing Rama V, Pichai, Nakhon Ratchasima, Samsen roads, then cuts across Si Yan intersection, as far as ends at the Chao Phraya river at the Payap pier. The total  distance is 3.185 km (round about one mi).

Previously, it was named "Rachawat road" (ถนนราชวัตร). Its name was derived from a kind of Chinese porcelain with a fence-like pattern, which was a collector's item in those days. It was a road that King Chulalongkorn (Rama V) graciously ordered to be constructed and it was also one of the roads in the group of "Amphoe (district) Dusit Roads Project" that was jointly started with the construction of Suan Dusit Palace in 1898 itself was blocking the pathway of the people that resided within that area, so for the convenience of transportation and communications for the public, the king graciously ordered that Ratchawat road was to be built around Suan Dusit Palace and also the convenience of the travelling between the northern outer suburb and inner capital, and between Samsen railway station and up till the Chao Phraya river.  

Later on February 16, 1919, which corresponds to the King Vajiravudh (Rama VI)'s reign, he graciously ordered that the name of Ratchawat road that started from the Chao Phraya river to Prathat Thong road (now Rama VI road) to be changed as "Nakhon Chai Si road" in honour of Prince Chirapravati Voradej, Prince of Nakhon Chai Si, one of sons of King Chulalongkorn and half brother of King Vajiravudh, who considered as "Father of the Thai Army".

Although it is short, Nakhon Chai Si road runs through important places, for example Rachawat bridge, a bridge over Khlong Prem Prachakon canal near the Dusit district office, Wat Amphawan, Wat Sawatwaree Simaram, Rachawat and Si Yan markets etc. In addition, the area that this road runs through is also known as "Rachawat" according its former name.

References

Dusit district
Phaya Thai district
Streets in Bangkok
1898 establishments in Siam